Stolarz or Stolorz is a Polish surname. It is a surname derived from the occupation of stolarz, a joiner, literally "table-maker". The surname may refer to:

Anthony Stolarz (born 1994), American professional ice hockey goaltender
Laurie Faria Stolarz, American author of young adult fiction novels,
Matthew Stolarz, a musician from band The Active Set
Michał Stolarz, Polish football midfielder
Justyna Stolarz, Polish costume designer, recipient of several film awards, such as Polish Academy Award for Best Costume Design
Bruno Stolorz (born 1955), German rugby coach

See also
 

Polish-language surnames
Occupational surnames